This is a list of Mexican films released in 2006.

2006

External links

References

2006
Films
Mexican